María de la Concepción Piquer López (13 December 190612 December 1990), better known as Concha Piquer (and sometimes billed as Conchita Piquer), was a Spanish singer and actress. She was known for her work in the copla form, and she performed her own interpretations of some of the key pieces in the Spanish song tradition, mostly works of the mid-20th century trio of composers Antonio Quintero, Rafael de León y Manuel Quiroga.

Biography
Piquer was born in Valencia, Spain. In 1922, she made her stage debut in New York City at the age of 14, and later appeared with Eddie Cantor, Al Jolson, and Fred and Adele Astaire. On 15 April 1923, she appeared in a short film, From Far Seville, made by Lee de Forest in his Phonofilm sound-on-film process, and shown at the Rivoli Theater in New York City that is considered to be the first sound-integrated film in history. This film is now in the Maurice Zouary collection at the U.S. Library of Congress.

Piquer died in Madrid on 12 December 1990.

Discography

Studio albums
 Conchita Piquer en la intimidad (1961)
 Conchita Piquer (1962)
 Canciones del espectaculo Puente de coplas (1964)

Compilation albums
 10 creaciones (1958)
 Sus grandes éxitos (1958)
 Canciones de oro (1986)
 Antología (1986)

Filmography
 From Far Seville (1923)
 El negro que tenía el alma blanca (1927)
 Wine Cellars (1930)
 Yo canto para ti (1934)
 La Dolores (1940)
 Filigrana (1949)
 Me casé con una estrella (1951)

Further reading
 Stephanie Sieburth, Survival Songs: Conchita Piquer's 'Coplas' and Franco's Regime of Terror, Table of Contents, Toronto: University of Toronto Press, 2014,

References

External links

 

1906 births
1990 deaths
Spanish film actresses
Spanish silent film actresses
People from Valencia
20th-century Spanish singers
20th-century Spanish women singers